The Stellihorn is a mountain of the Swiss Pennine Alps, overlooking the lake of Mattmark in the canton of Valais. It lies south of Saas-Almagell in the upper valley of Saas. The north side is covered by a glacier named Nollen Gletscher.

References

External links
Stellihorn on Hikr

Mountains of the Alps
Alpine three-thousanders
Mountains of Switzerland
Mountains of Valais